James M. Swift (November 3, 1873 – July 12, 1946) was a lawyer, District Attorney of Massachusetts Southern District and Attorney General of Massachusetts. He had returned to private practice until his death in 1946.

References

 

1873 births
1946 deaths
Massachusetts Attorneys General
Massachusetts Republicans
Harvard Law School alumni
University of Michigan alumni
People from Bristol County, Massachusetts
People from Ithaca, Michigan